Matej Palčič (born 21 June 1993) is a Slovenian footballer who plays for Koper as a defender.

References

External links
NZS profile 

1993 births
Living people
Sportspeople from Koper
Slovenian footballers
Slovenia youth international footballers
Slovenia under-21 international footballers
Slovenia international footballers
Association football fullbacks
FC Koper players
NK Maribor players
Wisła Kraków players
FC Sheriff Tiraspol players
Slovenian PrvaLiga players
Ekstraklasa players
Moldovan Super Liga players
Slovenian expatriate footballers
Slovenian expatriate sportspeople in Poland
Expatriate footballers in Poland
Slovenian expatriate sportspeople in Moldova
Expatriate footballers in Moldova